Buck Creek is an unincorporated community in Jefferson County, Kansas, United States.

History
A post office was opened in Buck Creek (also spelled historically as Buckcreek) in 1899, and remained in operation until it was discontinued in 1905.

References

Further reading

External links
 Jefferson County maps: Current, Historic, KDOT

Unincorporated communities in Jefferson County, Kansas
Unincorporated communities in Kansas